Bell City may refer to:
 Bell City, Kentucky
 Bell City, Louisiana
 Bell City, Missouri